Nikola Hrvatsko Tavares (born 17 January 1999) is a South African professional footballer who plays as a central defender for  club Dagenham & Redbridge. He is a product of the Crystal Palace and Brentford academies and was capped by Croatia at youth level.

Club career

Youth years 
A central defender, Tavares began his career in youth football in Cape Town, before moving into the academy at English club Brentford. He was a part of the U15 team which won the Junior Globe at the 2014 Milk Cup and he progressed to sign a scholarship deal in 2015. The Brentford academy was closed at the end of the 2015–16 season and Tavares trialled unsuccessfully with the U18 teams at Middlesbrough, Wolverhampton Wanderers and Brighton & Hove Albion during the early months of the 2016–17 season. His Brentford registration was cancelled in February 2017.

Crystal Palace 
Tavares joined the academy at Premier League club Crystal Palace in late 2016 and by February 2017 he had progressed to sign a professional contract to be a part of the Eagles' U23 team. In what remained of the 2016–17 season, he made 19 U23 and U18 appearances. Despite suffering an anterior cruciate ligament injury, he signed a new contract at the end of the 2017–18 season. He progressed to captain the U23 team during the 2018–19 season and was an unused substitute during the first team's final match of the campaign. Tavares signed a new one-year contract in July 2019 and was an unused substitute on four occasions during the 2019–20 season, before suffering a quadriceps injury late in the campaign. Entering the 2020–21 season injured and out of contract, Tavares signed one-month rolling contracts in order to remain at Selhurst Park during his rehabilitation. He was released in early 2021.

Wealdstone 
On 29 March 2021, Tavares joined National League club Wealdstone on a contract running until the end of the 2020–21 season. He made his debut in a league match versus Solihull Moors the following day and suffered a season-ending thigh injury 62 minutes into the 3–0 defeat. Tavares signed a new contract in July 2021 and made 27 appearances, scoring one goal, during a mid-table 2021–22 season. He turned down a new contract and departed Grosvenor Vale in June 2022.

Dagenham & Redbridge 
On 10 June 2022, Tavares signed a two-year contract with National League club Dagenham & Redbridge for a compensation fee. The transfer made him a full-time player. After making six appearances during the opening month of the 2022–23 season, Tavares suffered a season-ending injury.

International career 
Tavares won six caps for Croatia between U18 and U20 level. Passport issues prevented Tavares from being included in the South Africa U23 squad for two 2019 Africa U23 Cup of Nations qualifiers versus Angola in March 2019. He was named as "passport pending player" for South Africa's 2019 Africa Cup of Nations squad, but was not named in the final selection. In February 2020, Tavares was named in South Africa's preliminary squad for the 2020 Olympic Games.

Personal life 
Tavares was born in South Africa to a Portuguese father and a Croatian mother. His brother Marco is also a footballer.

Career statistics

References

External links

Nik Tavares at hns-cff.hr

Living people
English Football League players
Crystal Palace F.C. players
Association football central defenders
1999 births
South African soccer players
South African people of Portuguese descent
South African people of Croatian descent
Croatia youth international footballers
South African expatriate sportspeople in England
Soccer players from Cape Town
National League (English football) players
Wealdstone F.C. players
Dagenham & Redbridge F.C. players
Croatian people of Portuguese descent
Croatian expatriate sportspeople in England
South African expatriate soccer players
Expatriate footballers in England
Croatian expatriate footballers